Miami County is a county located in the U.S. state of Ohio. As of the 2020 census, the population was 108,774. Its county seat is Troy. The county is named  in honor of the Miami people.

Miami County is part of the Dayton, OH Metropolitan Statistical Area.

Geography

Adjacent counties
 Shelby County (north)
 Champaign County (northeast)
 Clark County (southeast)
 Montgomery County (south)
 Darke County (west)

Demographics

2000 census
As of the census of 2000, there were 98,868 people, 38,437 households, and 27,943 families living in the county. The population density was 243 people per square mile (94/km2). There were 40,554 housing units at an average density of 100 per square mile (38/km2). The racial makeup of the county was 95.78% White, 1.95% Black or African American, 0.19% Native American, 0.79% Asian, 0.01% Pacific Islander, 0.28% from other races, and 1.00% from two or more races. 0.73% of the population were Hispanic or Latino of any race.

There were 38,437 households, out of which 33.30% had children under the age of 18 living with them, 59.50% were married couples living together, 9.70% had a female householder with no husband present, and 27.30% were non-families. 23.20% of all households were made up of individuals, and 9.50% had someone living alone who was 65 years of age or older. The average household size was 2.54 and the average family size was 2.99.

In the county, the population was spread out, with 25.90% under the age of 18, 7.60% from 18 to 24, 28.40% from 25 to 44, 24.80% from 45 to 64, and 13.20% who were 65 years of age or older. The median age was 38 years. For every 100 females there were 96.20 males. For every 100 females age 18 and over, there were 92.40 males.

The median income for a household in the county was $44,109, and the median income for a family was $51,169. Males had a median income of $37,357 versus $25,493 for females. The per capita income for the county was $21,669. About 5.10% of families and 6.70% of the population were below the poverty line, including 9.10% of those under age 18 and 5.60% of those age 65 or over.

2010 census
As of the 2010 United States Census, there were 102,506 people, 40,917 households, and 28,626 families living in the county. The racial makeup of the county was 94.4% white, 2.0% black or African American, 1.2% Asian, 0.2% American Indian, 0.5% from other races, and 1.8% from two or more races. Those of Hispanic or Latino origin made up 1.3% of the population. In terms of ancestry, 34.5% were German, 13.5% were Irish, 10.2% were English, and 9.8% were American.

Of the 40,917 households, 32.3% had children under the age of 18 living with them, 54.7% were married couples living together, 10.5% had a female householder with no husband present, 30.0% were non-families, and 25.3% of all households were made up of individuals. The average household size was 2.48 and the average family size was 2.95. The median age was 40.6 years.

The median income for a household in the county was $51,507 and the median income for a family was $61,190. Males had a median income of $46,133 versus $32,699 for females. The per capita income for the county was $25,006. About 7.0% of families and 9.5% of the population were below the poverty line, including 14.0% of those under age 18 and 4.8% of those age 65 or over.

Politics
Miami County is a Republican stronghold county in presidential elections, with Democrats winning the county only three times in 1912, 1936, and 1964.

|}

Government

Current officials
 Board of Commissioners:
 Ted Mercer (R)
 Wade Westfall (R)
 Greg Simmons (R)
 County Auditor: Matthew W. Gearhardt (R)
 Clerk of Courts: Shawn Peeples (R)
 County Coroner: William N. Ginn, M.D. (R)
 County Engineer: Paul Huelskamp (R)
 County Prosecutor: Anthony E. Kendell (R)
 County Recorder:  Jessica Lopez (R)
 Sheriff: Dave Duchak (R)
 County Treasurer: James Stubbs (R)

Miami County Court of Common Pleas
 Judges:
 Stacy Wall (R)
 Jeannine Pratt (R)
 Scott Altenburger(R)
Municipal Court
 Judges:
 Samuel Huffman(R)
 Gary Nasal (R)
 Magistrates:
 James Utrecht

Education

Public school districts
 Bethel Local Schools
 Bethel High School, Bethel Township (the Bees)
 Bradford Schools
 Bradford High School, Bradford (the Railroaders)
 Covington Exempted Village School District
 Covington High School, Covington (the Buccs/Buccaneers)
 Miami East Local Schools
 Miami East High School, Casstown (the Vikings)
 Milton-Union Exempted Village Schools
 Milton-Union High School, West Milton (the Bulldogs)
 Newton Local School District
 Newton High School, Newton (the Indians)
 Piqua City School District
 Piqua High School, Piqua (the Indians)
 Tipp City Exempted Village School District
 Tippecanoe High School, Tipp City (the Red Devils)
 Troy City School District
 Troy High School, Troy (the Trojans)

Miscellaneous education
The Western Ohio Japanese Language School (オハイオ西部日本語学校 Ohaio Seibu Nihongo Gakkō) is a supplementary weekend Japanese school in unincorporated Miami County, near Troy. It started in April 1988.

Communities

Cities
 Huber Heights (part)
 Piqua
 Tipp City
 Troy (county seat)
 Union (part)

Villages

 Bradford (part)
 Casstown
 Covington
 Fletcher
 Laura
 Ludlow Falls
 Pleasant Hill
 Potsdam
 West Milton

Townships

 Bethel
 Brown
 Concord
 Elizabeth
 Lostcreek
 Monroe
 Newberry
 Newton
 Springcreek
 Staunton
 Union
 Washington

https://web.archive.org/web/20160715023447/http://www.ohiotownships.org/township-websites

Unincorporated communities
 Alcony
 Bloomer
 Brandt
 Conover
 Frederick
 Garland
 Ginghamsburg
 Grayson
 Kessler
 Lena
 Phoneton
 Polo
 Rossville
 West Charleston

See also
 National Register of Historic Places listings in Miami County, Ohio

References

External links

 County website
 The 1909 Centennial History of Piqua, Troy and Miami County

,

 
1807 establishments in Ohio
Populated places established in 1807